Letohrad (until 1950 Kyšperk) is a town in Ústí nad Orlicí District in the Pardubice Region of the Czech Republic. It has about 6,400 inhabitants. The historic town centre is well preserved and is protected by law as an urban monument zone.

Administrative parts
Villages of Červená, Kunčice and Orlice are administrative parts of Letohrad.

Etymology
The original German name Geiersberg meant "vulture's mountain" and the Czech name Kynšperk was created by its transcription. The modern name Letohrad was created by amalgamation of the words letovisko (meaning "summer resort") and hradisko (meaning "gord").

Geography
It lies in the Podorlická Uplands. The Tichá Orlice river flows through the town.

History

The first written mention of Kyšperk Castle, a predecessor of the settlement, is from 1308 when it was mentioned in Zbraslav chronicles. It was founded by the Lords of Žampach in the 13th century. Existence of the castle was last mentioned in 1419. In 1513, the town of Kyšperk was first mentioned. It was probably founded much earlier as a settlement beneath the castle, but it had the same owner all the time and there was no reason to create records.

The town experienced a rapid development in the 17th century, when the estate was owned by the Vitanovský of Vlčkovice family. During the rule of Hynek Jetřich Vitanovský of Vlčkovice, Kyšperk greatly improved its state: he had rebuilt the original fortress into a Baroque castle, had built a castle chapel which later became the Church of Saint Wenceslaus, handcraftsmen were allowed to establish guilds, and a hospital for poor and old people was founded.

The large fire from 1824 burned down 76 houses. In 1874 a railway crossed Kyšperk, starting the growth of the textile industry. After World War II, Kyšperk turned into a modern town with a major electrotechnical industry.

In 1950, the municipalities of Kynšperk, Orlice, Kunčice and Rotnek were merged. The new municipality was named Letohrad. Kyšperk was renamed Letohrad and Rotnek was renamed Červená. After the Velvet Revolution in 1989 the historical centre of the town was renovated.

Demographics

Economy
The OEZ s.r.o. company, manufacturer of circuit breakers, fuses and other wiring equipment, is the largest employer in the town.

Sport
Letohrad is known for its biathlon club, from which several national representatives and Olympic medalists come. There is a ski resort in Kunčice.

The town'n football club FK OEZ Letohrad plays in the lower amateur tiers.

Sights

The historical centre is formed by Václavské Square with preserved Baroque burgher houses, the Church of Saint Wenceslaus, the castle and Marian column in the middle. The Baroque Church of Saint Wenceslaus is from 1680–1685, decorated with stucco by the Italian master Giovanni Maderna.

The original Renaissance Letohrad Castle was built in 1554 and rebuilt in early Baroque style in 1680–1685. It contains an exposition on contemporary way of life open to the public, rest of the premises houses a hotel, a school, the cultural centre, or the Museum of Jára Cimrman. The castle is surrounded by an English-style park.

Other museums in the town are the Town Museum or the Museum of Crafts.

Notable people
František Vladislav Hek (1769–1847), early activist of Czech National Revival; died here
Alphonse Mucha (1860–1939), painter; lived and worked in this town in 1934–35
Josef Korbel (1909–1977), diplomat
Vlasta Štěpová (born 1938), politician and economist
Michal Šlesingr (born 1983), biathlete; raised here
Ondřej Moravec (born 1984), biathlete; raised here

Twin towns – sister cities

Letohrad is twinned with:
 Daruvar, Croatia
 Hausen am Albis, Switzerland
 Niemcza, Poland

References

External links

Cities and towns in the Czech Republic
Populated places in Ústí nad Orlicí District